Sadegh Sadegh, also known by the inherited bestowed title Mostashar al-Dowleh, was an Iranian diplomat and constitutionalist politician.

References 

 

People of the Persian Constitutional Revolution
Speakers of the National Consultative Assembly
Members of the 1st Iranian Majlis
Members of the 2nd Iranian Majlis
Ambassadors of Iran to Turkey
Democrat Party (Persia) politicians
Members of the Senate of Iran
People of Pahlavi Iran
19th-century Iranian people
20th-century Iranian people